Unusually shaped fruits and vegetables have a shape not in line with its normal body plan. While some examples are just oddly shaped, others are heralded for their amusing appearance, often because they resemble a body part such as the buttocks or genitalia. Pareidolia can be common in vegetables, with some people reporting the appearance of religious imagery.

Causes
Vegetables usually grow into an unusual shape due to environmental conditions. Damage to one part of the vegetable can cause the growth to slow in that area while the rest grows at the normal rate. When a root vegetable is growing and the tip is damaged, it can sometimes split, forming multiple roots attached at one point. If a plant is in the primordium (embryonic development) stage, damage to the growing vegetable can cause more extreme mutations.

The unusual shape can also be forced upon the vegetable. In Japan, farmers of the Zentsuji region found a way to grow square watermelons by growing the fruits in glass boxes and letting them naturally assume the shape of the receptacle.  The square-shaped watermelon was intended to make the melons easier to stack and store, but because the melons must be picked before they are ripe they are inedible; the cubic watermelons are also often more than double the price of normal watermelons. Using similar techniques, growers have also created more complex shapes of watermelon, including dice, pyramids, and faces.

Root vegetables, especially those such as carrots and parsnips, will naturally grow around or avoid obstacles in the soil such as small stones and other foreign objects to prevent damage to the developing root, resulting in a wide variety of different shapes.

Legislation
In the European Union, attempts to introduce legislation prohibiting the sale of misshapen fruit and vegetables were defeated. The proposed "uniform standardisation parameters" would have applied to straight bananas and curved cucumbers, as well as to more extreme cases such as carrots with multiple "legs", or fused fruit. The main concern for opponents of the proposed legislation was the ethical question of the wastage it would have generated if growers were forced to discard up to 20% of their crop, produce that was nutritionally identical to more regularly shaped specimens.

Changing consumer behaviour
As of 2015, around 40% of commercially-grown fruits and vegetables are not eaten as they do not meet retailers' cosmetic standards. In France, the  campaign aims to encourage the purchase of more unusually shaped vegetables and fruits to combat food waste.

A similar campaign, "Frutta Brutta", was started in Milan, Italy.  Multiple startups in the US have also been formed to sell and repurpose surplus and oddly shaped produce.

Competitions
It is common in some countries to celebrate the diversity of vegetable shapes, with particularly unusual items being entered into competitions.  Many of these are judged by the ugliness of the vegetable. Some organisations run contests in which gardeners enter the largest vegetables that they have grown.

In popular culture
The popular BBC television program That's Life! mixed investigative journalism with more lighthearted sections, which included items on unusually shaped vegetables.

The BBC comedy television program Blackadder contains several jokes relating to the character Baldrick and his obsession with odd-shaped turnips. The most notable example occurs in the episode "Beer", in which Baldrick discovers  a turnip shaped like a "thingy," giving rise to several jokes throughout the episode.

Gallery

See also
Supernumerary body part
Square watermelon

References

External links
Love Carrots and Other Vegetables - "A sporadic photographic journal of weird or humorous vegetables".
The Mutato Collection - "A collection of non-standard fruits, roots and vegetables".
MoFa-Museum of Food Anomalies - "An online exhibition of the Art of Regular Food Gone Horribly Wrong."
"Attempt at EU-wide 'wonky fruit and veg' ban fails."

Vegetables